Christopher Strong is a romance novel by the British writer Gilbert Frankau which was first published in 1932.

Film adaptation
In 1933 the novel was adapted into an American film Christopher Strong made by RKO Pictures and starring Katharine Hepburn and Colin Clive.

References

Bibliography
 Goble, Alan. The Complete Index to Literary Sources in Film. Walter de Gruyter, 1999.

1932 British novels
British novels adapted into films
Novels by Gilbert Frankau
Novels set in England
British romance novels
Hutchinson (publisher) books